"Shooting Star" is the debut solo single of hip hop artist David Rush, from his debut release Feel the Rush Vol. 1. It features Kevin Rudolf, LMFAO, and rapper Pitbull. The single version of the song is the "Party Rock" remix of the original song, which features LMFAO.

Music video
Universal Republic Records shot a music video for the song on late April 2009. It can be watched at YouTube, it shows in most part of the video a galaxy and outer space background, the video opens with LMFAO presenting David Rush, Kevin Rudolf and Pitbull. Directed by David Rosseau.

In popular culture
The song was used at the 9th edition of the Miss Earth Pageant celebrated in Boracay, Philippines on November 22, 2009. It was also used in the final dance battle of the 2010 film Step Up 3D along with "Move Shake Drop" by DJ Laz.

Official versions
 "Shooting Star" (Album version) featuring Kevin Rudolf & Pitbull

Chart positions

References

2009 songs
2009 debut singles
Pitbull (rapper) songs
David Rush songs
Kevin Rudolf songs
LMFAO songs
Songs written by Pitbull (rapper)
Songs written by Kevin Rudolf